Calvert Hills Station is a pastoral lease that operates as a cattle station in the Northern Territory of Australia.

Other pastoral leases surround the property including Wollogorang Station to the east, Pungalina-Seven Emu Sanctuary and the Garawa Aboriginal Land Trust to the north, Kiana to the west, Cresswell Downs to the south west and Benmarra and the Wanyi-Garawa Aboriginal Land Trust to the south.

Alex Chapple, an American, acquired the property prior to 1996. He employed Paul Edmonds as manager who convinced him to hold onto the station. The property was mostly under developed at this stage and had also been destocked to eradicate brucellosis and tuberculosis.

The  station was listed in 2013 along with at least 15 others following the live export ban to Indonesia. It sold later the same year, the first in 12 months to the McMillan Pasotral Company when it was stocked with 15,000 head of cattle for 15 million.

In 1949 the property changed ownership when Camp and MacIntosh acquired it from the estate of J. Clarke.

See also
List of ranches and stations

References

Stations (Australian agriculture)
Pastoral leases in the Northern Territory